Sammy Lee may refer to:

Sammy Tak Lee (born 1939), Hong Kong billionaire property developer
Sammy Lee (scientist) (1958–2012), expert in in vitro fertilisation
Sammy Lee (diver) (1920–2016), Korean-American diver, physician, and two-time Olympic Games champion
Sammy Lee (footballer) (born 1959), former Liverpool footballer and former Bolton Wanderers manager
Sammy Lee (boxer) (born 1999), Welsh boxer
Satoru Sayama (born 1957), Japanese wrestler advertised as "Sammy Lee" in the United Kingdom
Sammy Lee (choreographer) (1890–1968), American dance director
Sammy Lee (producer), see The Upside of Anger
Sammy Lee, fictional character, protagonist of 1963 film The Small World of Sammy Lee

See also
Sam Lee (disambiguation)
Samuel Lee (disambiguation)